Wiener schnitzel ('Viennese cutlet'), sometimes spelled Wienerschnitzel, is a type of schnitzel made of a thin, breaded, pan-fried veal cutlet.

It is one of the best known specialities of Viennese cuisine, and one of the national dishes of Austria.

History and etymology 

The designation  first appeared in the 19th century, with the first known mention in a cookbook from 1831.

According to a tale, field marshal Joseph Radetzky von Radetz brought the recipe from Italy to Vienna in 1857. In 2007, linguist Heinz-Dieter Pohl could prove that this story had been invented. According to Pohl, the dish is first mentioned in connection with Radetzky in 1869 in an Italian gastronomy book (Guida gastronomica d'Italia), which was published in German in 1871 as Italien tafelt, and it is claimed that the story instead concerned the cotoletta alla milanese. Before this time, the story was unknown in Austria. The Radetzky legend is however based on this book, which claims that a Count Attems, an adjutant to the emperor Franz Joseph I of Austria gave a notice from Radetzky about the situation in Lombardy and mentioned a tasty veal steak in a margin note. After Radetzky had returned, the emperor personally requested the recipe from him.

Pohl relates this anecdote with the words: "This story is scientifically meaningless, it does not cite any sources and it is not mentioned […] in the literature about Radetzky. No such Count Attems appears in any biographical work about the Austrian monarchy, which would have corresponded to this time and position."

Pohl doubts that Wiener schnitzel came from Italy at all, with the basis that in the other "imported dishes" in Austrian cuisine, the original concept is mentioned, even if in Germanised form, such as in goulash or palatschinke, and the schnitzel does not appear even in specialised cookbooks about Italian cuisine.

Pohl hints that there had been other dishes in Austrian cuisine, before the Schnitzel, that were breaded and deep fried, such as the popular Backhendl, which was first mentioned in a cookbook from 1719.

Documents in the Milan archive of Saint Ambrose dated 1148 use the Latin name , which can be translated as "little chops with breadcrumbs". This can be a hint that a dish similar to the  already existed at that time.

In 1887, E. F. Knight wrote of a Wiener schnitzel ordered in a Rotterdam cafe, "as far as I could make out, the lowest layer of a Wienerschnitzel consists of juicy veal steaks and slices of lemon peel; the next layer is composed of sardines; then come sliced gherkins, capers, and diverse mysteries; a delicate sauce flavours the whole, and the result is a gastronomic dream."

Preparation 

The bread crumbs must not be pressed into the meat, so that they stay dry and can be "souffléd". Finally the Schnitzel is fried in a good proportion of lard or clarified butter at a temperature of  until it is golden yellow. The Schnitzel must swim in the fat, otherwise it will not cook evenly: the fat cools too much and intrudes into the bread crumbs, moistening them. During the frying the Schnitzel is repeatedly slightly tossed around the pan. Also during the frying, fat can be scooped from the pan with a spoon and poured onto the meat. The Schnitzel is cooked after it turns golden yellow or brown.

The dish is traditionally served in Austria with butterhead lettuce tossed with a sweetened vinaigrette dressing, optionally with chopped chives or onions, potato salad, cucumber salad, or parsley potatoes. In earlier days, the garnish consisted of capers and anchovies, nowadays a lemon slice and parsley are more common.

Similar dishes 

A popular variation is made with pork instead of veal, because pork is cheaper than veal (usually about half the price). To avoid confusion, Austrian law requires that  be made of veal.

Similar dishes to Wiener schnitzel include  (from cured meat), and breaded turkey or chicken steaks. Similarly prepared dishes include , schnitzel cordon bleu filled with ham and cheese and Pariser Schnitzel. The American chicken-fried steak is often said to be closely related to Wiener schnitzel, the result of the adaptation of the recipe by German or Austrian immigrants to the Texas Hill Country to locally available ingredients.

Tonkatsu is a similar, fried pork cutlet from Japanese cuisine, thicker than its European counterparts.

In the Southern Cone, particularly in Argentina and Uruguay, a similar dish is milanesa. It is often served with french fries or mashed potatoes.

In Israel, schnitzel is popular, first introduced by European Jews who immigrated to Israel during the middle decades of the twentieth century. Owing to food shortages at that time and the high cost of meat and veal, and due to kashrut laws that forbid eating pork, the local version was made of chicken breast, which was less expensive. To this day, Israeli schnitzel is made of chicken. Kashrut laws also forbid using milk, butter or similar dairy products with meat, so kosher schnitzel is prepared with cooking oil. Schnitzel has become so popular that it is regularly described as one of Israel's "national dishes."

See also 
 List of veal dishes

References

Further reading 
 Haslinger, Ingrid: Entwicklungsstationen einiger typischer Gerichte der Wiener Küche. In: Dannielczyk, Julia; Wasner-Peter, Isabella (ed.): "Heut' muß der Tisch sich völlig bieg'n". Wiener Küche und ihre Kochbücher, Mandelbaum-Verlag, vienna 2007, pp. 11–48
 Zahnhausen, Richard: Das Wiener Schnitzel. Struktur und Geschichte einer alltäglichen Speise. In: Wiener Geschichtsblätter, issue 2/2001, pp. 132–146. .

External links 

 Zur Geschichte des Wiener Schnitzels  
 Zur Geschichte von Wiener Schnitzel und Costoletta alla Milanese, mit historischen Rezepten 
 Wiener Schnitzel, All About The Most Loved Food From Austria, Vienna Unwrapped
 Crumbs, what a town  – a survey by The Sydney Morning Herald of Viennese restaurants and their Wiener Schnitzels

Austrian cuisine
Breaded cutlets
German cuisine
Veal dishes
National dishes